Rusted Root is the fourth studio album by Rusted Root, released in 1998.

Track listing
All songs written by Michael Glabicki except where noted.
 "She Roll Me Up" – 4:20
 "Rising Sun" – 3:03
 "Magenta Radio" – 4:26
 "My Love" (Jim DiSpirito, Glabicki) – 4:21
 "Live a Long Time" – 3:41
 "Kill You Dead" – 4:29
 "Airplane" (Liz Berlin, Glabicki) – 3:16
 "Agbadza" (DiSpirito, Glabicki) – 4:34
 "Moon" (Berlin, Glabicki) – 4:24
 "Away From" – 4:11
 "Flower" – 4:53
 "You Can't Always Get What You Want" (Mick Jagger, Keith Richards) – 6:46

Personnel

Liz Berlin  – Vocals (background), Guitar (12 String), Vocal Arrangement, Organ Arrangement
John Buynak  – Guitar (Electric)
Jack Casady  – Bass
David Coleman  – Cello, Harmonium, String Arrangements
Jim DiSpirito  – Talking Drum
Jim Donovan  – Drums, Gong, Tom-Tom, Vocals (background), Trash Cans, Kashmiri Bell
Michael Falzarano  – Mandolin
Michael Glabicki  – Guitar (Acoustic), Guitar (Electric), Vocals, Vocals (background), Hi String Guitar (Acoustic)
Jorma Kaukonen  – Guitar
Jeff Lawrence  – Guitar
Patrick Norman  – Bass, Guitar (Electric), Marimba, Vocals (background), Cabasa
Susan Rogers  – Vocals (background), Producer
Pete Sears  – Organ, Piano, Accordion, Wurlitzer
Andrew Sharp  – Vocals (background), Production Coordination
Harvey Sorgen  – Washboard
John "Flappy" Stovicek  – Guitar

Production

Peter Beckerman  – Engineer
Jack Hersca  – Assistant Engineer
George Marino  – Mastering
Pat Moran  – Producer, Engineer
Susan Rogers – Producer
Mike Speranzo  – Engineer

References 

1998 albums
Rusted Root albums
Mercury Records albums
PolyGram albums
Albums produced by Pat Moran